Sportivo Belgrano is an Argentine football club, which home town is located in San Francisco, Córdoba. The team currently plays in the Primera B Nacional, the second division of the Argentine football league system.

History
On 15 April 1914, a group of young people decided to establish a social club in the city of San Francisco, Córdoba. The name was chosen as a tribute to Manuel Belgrano, the creator of the flag of Argentina.

In 2008, during a match against Mendocino team Deportivo Maipú, several Belgrano players and their coach Cristian Domizzi attacked referee Héctor Sosa. The coach of Deportivo Maipú. A disciplinary panel deducted 9 points from the club, costing them the chance of promotion. The verdict also banned Sperdutti from management for one year and several Belgrano players were suspended for 30 games. In addition, the disciplinary panel set a number of restrictions on the stadium, which included 3 home games of the 2008/09 season being played behind closed doors and five more games with limited tickets for sale.

In June 2013, the club secured promotion to play at Primera B Nacional after a 1–1 tie against Deportivo Santamarina at the playoff's second time (the first had ended 0–0).

Current squad

References

External links

Official website 
Locura Verde 
Pasión por Sportivo 

Football clubs in Córdoba Province, Argentina
Association football clubs established in 1914
Sportivo Belgrano